Shaan–Gan–Ning, or in postal romanization Shen–Kan–Ning, commonly known by its historical sources as the Yan'an Soviet was a historical proto-state that was formed in 1937 by the Chinese Communist Party following the collapse of the Chinese Soviet Republic in agreement with the Kuomintang as a part of the Second United Front policy, substituting the former anti-Kuomintang Soviets. It existed until 1950.

It served as the headquarters base area and was one of the two border region governments with the capital at Yan'an, named after the provinces of Shaanxi, Gansu, and Ningxia with some parts incorporated from Suiyuan province which is now part of Inner Mongolia. Later, the second region that was created was known as the Jin-Cha-Ji Border Area. It is lesser known because the name refers to the old geographic realities, which were Shanxi, Chahar, and Hebei, respectively.

References 

Chinese Civil War
Chinese Communist Party
History of Shaanxi
Yan'an
Former countries in Chinese history